Renardbreen (The Fox Glacier) is a glacier in Wedel Jarlsberg Land at Spitsbergen, Svalbard. It is located between the ridges of Activekammen and Bohlinryggen, and debouches into Recherche Fjord.

References

Glaciers of Spitsbergen